Bart Griemink (born 29 March 1972) is a Dutch former professional football goalkeeper.

He played in the Football League with Birmingham City, Barnsley, Peterborough United, Swindon Town and Southend United. He then played for Boston Town in the United Counties League for two seasons.

References

External links

 http://www.swindon-town-fc.co.uk/Person.asp?PersonID=GRIEMINB
 https://www.gazetteandherald.co.uk/news/7372166.fight-is-on-for-keepers-jersey/
 https://www.gazetteandherald.co.uk/news/7375703.threat-of-ex-posh-youngsters/
 https://www.gazetteandherald.co.uk/news/7399706.todd-wants-bartman-out-of-the-headlines/
 https://www.gazetteandherald.co.uk/news/7369606.cool-start-for-bart/
 https://www.gazetteandherald.co.uk/news/7404288.bartman-is-back/
 http://news.bbc.co.uk/sport2/hi/football/teams/s/southend_utd/4755019.stm
 https://www.skysports.com/football/news/11716/2310094/griemink-out-for-shrimpers
 https://www.skysports.com/football/news/11764/2179778/posh-duo-move-out
voetbalschrijver.web-log.nl

1972 births
Living people
Sportspeople from Oss
Dutch footballers
FC Emmen players
Willem II (football club) players
WKE players
Birmingham City F.C. players
Barnsley F.C. players
Peterborough United F.C. players
Swindon Town F.C. players
Southend United F.C. players
Boston Town F.C. players
English Football League players
Association football goalkeepers
Footballers from North Brabant